The 24 June 2009 Baghdad bombing was one of the bombings in Iraq and a bombing that occurred in the Muraidi Market of the Sadr City area of Baghdad, Iraq. At least 69 people were killed and 150 others injured. An official said that the explosion was caused by a bomb hidden underneath a motorised vegetable cart in the market, as reported by the BBC and CNN. As reported by The New York Times, the Iraqi Interior Ministry said that it was caused by a bomb attached to a motorcycle. Civilians tried to help the injured following the explosion, until security forces forced them back to allow emergency services to enter the market. The Iraqi Army, the Iraqi government, the American military and Iraqi political parties were held responsible for the bombing by the witnesses and relatives of the wounded. Politicians affiliated with Muqtada al-Sadr accused the 11th Brigade of the Iraqi Army, which is responsible for Sadr City, for the attack. These politicians also said that the American military was partly to blame, because they brought the 11th Brigade to the neighbourhood.

Political statements 

Ahmed al-Masoudi, a member of Parliament, stated "how come the Muraidi Market that is surrounded by blast walls and no vehicle or motorcycle can go inside but they allowed in this motorcycle?... The 11th Brigade is directly involved in these crimes, these murders."

Other attacks on 24 June 2009 
In Baghdad, one person was killed and 10 were wounded in the Sunni community of Hay al Jihad in western Baghdad. A bomb was hidden in a plastic bag outside a coffee shop and detonated.
A roadside bomb in Saadiya neighbourhood, southwestern Baghdad, wounded four people.

See also
List of bombings during the Iraq War

References

2009 murders in Iraq
21st-century mass murder in Iraq
Mass murder in 2009
Terrorist incidents in Iraq in 2009
Terrorist incidents in Sadr City
2000s in Baghdad
June 2009 events in Iraq